"Won't Be Long" is a song written by J. Leslie McFarland and performed by Aretha Franklin.  The song reached number 7 on the U.S. R&B chart and number 76 on the Billboard Hot 100 in 1961.  The song appeared on her 1961 album, Aretha. The song was produced by John Hammond.

Chart performance

Aretha Franklin

Other recordings
The song has been recorded by numerous artists, including Dusty Springfield, Sly & the Family Stone, and Eva Cassidy.

References

1960 songs
1960 singles
Aretha Franklin songs
Columbia Records singles
Jazz songs
Songs written by John Leslie McFarland
Song recordings produced by John Hammond (record producer)